Neelkanth temple is a Hindu temple in the Rajgarh tehsil, in Alwar district, Rajasthan, India. It is dedicated to Lord Shiva (Neelkanth is one of the name given to Shiva). It is situated in an isolated hill near the Sariska National Park, and access can only be gained by a steep track. It was built between the 6th to the 9th century CE by Parmeshwara Mathanadeva, a local Pratihara feudatory.

Erotic statues 
It shows a number of sculptures, including erotic ones, in the same style shown in Khajuraho.

Naugaza Digambar Jain temple 

Naugaza Digambar Jain temple consist of colossal statue of Jain Tirthankara Shantinatha, in a Digambara style build in 922-23 A.D.

References

External links 
 Archaeological Survey of India
 Rajasthan Tourism

Tourist attractions in Alwar district
Shiva temples in Rajasthan